Fehringer is a surname of South German origin. Notable people with the surname include:

Franz Fehringer (1910–1988), German operatic tenor
Hermann Fehringer (born 1962), Austrian pole vaulter

References

Low German surnames